The Russian route M2 (also known as the Crimea Highway,) is a major trunk road that connects Moscow to Crimea. It is part of the European route E105. It is 720 kilometers long.

Inaugurated in 1950, the highway starts at the junction of the Moscow Ring Road and Varshavskoye Shosse and travels south-west, immediately bypassing the cities of Tula, Oryol, Kursk and Belgorod before terminating at the border with Ukraine. 

West of the border at Hoptivka, the road continues through Kharkov and Zaporizhia to Simferopol and Yalta as the Ukrainian M20 and M18. Prior to the 2014 annexation of Crimea by Russian Federation, it was used by Russian summer vacationers who travel to the Black Sea resorts of Crimea; that journey may now be made  by the M4 and A290 instead.

History
At the heart of the route of the road lies the ancient Crimean tract. The highway Moscow - Kharkov section was built in 1840–60. The road was completely renovated in 1946–50, Getting asphalt cover. The route Moscow - Kharkiv - Simferopol in the Soviet period had the number 4.

By the time of the 1980 Summer Olympics in Moscow, it was decided to build a high-speed road understudy. Olympic Torch Relay took place partly on the new road, despite the fact that only a part of the route in the Moscow region and the junction with the Ring Road was completed in 1980. This was the first interchange in the Soviet Union, the traffic movement on which was carried out in three levels.

See also
 Berlinka, the never-completed Reichsautobahn Berlin-Königsberg of the Third Reich into East Prussia.

Roads in Russia